Sunwu is a town of Sunwu County, Heihe, Heilongjiang, People's Republic of China.

Administrative divisions 
As of 2017, it had six residential committees and nine villages under its administration. The town administers the following:

Residential committees:

 Jianhua, Guangming, Xinhua, Shangmao, Yongxing, Tiebei

Villages:

 Hebei, Xinxing, Xinghua, Beisun, Santun, Yongyue, Xingchuan, Yongsheng, Zhennan

See also 

 List of township-level divisions of Heilongjiang

References 

Township-level divisions of Heilongjiang
Heihe